OpenAFS is an open-source implementation of the Andrew distributed file system (AFS). AFS was originally developed at Carnegie Mellon University, and developed as a commercial product by the Transarc Corporation, which was subsequently acquired by IBM. At LinuxWorld on 15 August 2000, IBM announced their plans to release a version of their commercial AFS product under the IBM Public License. This became OpenAFS. Today, OpenAFS is actively developed for a wide range of operating system families including: AIX, Mac OS X, Darwin, HP-UX, Irix, Solaris, Linux, Microsoft Windows, FreeBSD, NetBSD.

Foundation 
The OpenAFS Foundation was established on May 20, 2013 as a non-profit organization dedicated to fostering the stability and growth of OpenAFS.

Governance
Governance of the project is split between the board of elders who consider issues of strategic direction, and the gatekeepers who control the source repository.

Licensing
Although there is no legal entity that owns the OpenAFS source code, copyright on many files is attributed to IBM.  Most of the source is covered by the IPL, however several files in the tree are covered by university vanity licenses.  All applicable licenses are listed in a file in the source repository called openafs/doc/LICENSE.

Development
The contributors over the last five years have made significant improvements to both the implementation and the AFS3 protocol without breaking interoperability with the IBM/Transarc releases.  Since that announcement was written, several large development projects have been integrated, such as: 64-bit MS-Windows support, MS-Windows 7 support, Apple-Mac OS X v10.4-v10.9 support, and the demand attach fileserver.

Many development projects are at various stages of completion.  The following are several prominent examples:

 Fileserver backend utilizing object storage
 rxtcp
 rxgk
 rxk5
 Instrumentation framework
 Byte-range locking support

Deployment
The existing user base includes small single server cells as well as large multinational deployments spanning academia, private research laboratories, government, and commercial entities.  A small snapshot of the deployed AFS cells can be found by reviewing the contents of the CellServDB file distributed with OpenAFS.

References

External links

OpenAFS website
AFS Wiki

Network file systems
Free network-related software
IBM software
File systems supported by the Linux kernel